Marta Docando Gómez (born 13 May 1982), also known as Marti, is a Spanish retired football midfielder. She played for Rayo Vallecano, Atlético Madrid and AD Torrejón in her career.

Career
At Atlético Madrid, Docando played as one of the captains alongside Alba Merino. She played for the Basque Country national team in a game against Slovakia, a game which the Basque Country won 1–0. On 20 June 2012, she announced her retirement from football.

Playing style
Gara praised Docando for her technical ability and vision. Mundo Deportivo, in a 2004 article, also commented on her technical ability in a positive way and also opined that she was effective in both defence and attack. They did express, however, that she lacked physical ability at the time.

References

1982 births
Living people
Spanish women's footballers
Primera División (women) players
Atlético Madrid Femenino players
Rayo Vallecano Femenino players
Women's association football midfielders
Footballers from Barakaldo
AD Torrejón CF Femenino players